Sewell Mill Creek is a tributary of Sope Creek in Marietta, Georgia, United States. Via Sope Creek and the Chattahoochee River, it is part of the Apalachicola River basin, draining to the Gulf of Mexico.

References

Rivers of Georgia (U.S. state)
Marietta, Georgia
Rivers of Cobb County, Georgia